The discography of the American active rock band Random Hero consists of three EPs, one compilation album, and five radio singles.

The band is produced exclusively by Ben Kasica, famed guitarist of the band Skillet.  Random Hero is known for their energy charged live shows and widely appealing music.

The band has worked with MTV, the ESPN X-Games, AMA Motocross, the Go Fast Extreme Games, and is the exclusive band for the Live the Dream Tour.  Live the Dream Tour is an organization that holds unique assembly programs for high school and middle school students in order to donate money to the fledgling school music programs.

Studio albums
Recorded at B Train Studios, Carry Me, Bury Me is the first LP released by Random Hero and is slated to be released on June 18, 2013.

Carry Me, Bury Me Album Track listing

Compilation albums
The Random Hero EP is the first compilation EP released by Random Hero. The Random Hero EP is only available on max3's website for download.  The band recorded the new songs at Spiked Audio in Highlands Ranch, CO in 2008 and was released in November 20, 2009.

{|class="wikitable" border="1"
!Year
!Details
|-
| 2009
|"'Random Hero EP Released: November 20, 2009
 Recorded:  Spiked Audio
 Engineered & Mixed by Michael Morrissey
 Produced:  Scottie Flint
 Label: FURY ARTIST / Fury Sound
 Format: Digital Download (max3 systems inc.)
|-
|}

 Random Hero EP Track listing 

Extended playsThe EP (aka the Black EP) is the first extended play EP released by Random Hero. The Black EP was distributed at shows and as an iTunes download, with a black background to the cover art, hence the unofficial alternate name to distinguish from the later release by the same name.  The band recorded the new songs at Spiked Audio in Highlands Ranch, CO and was released in October 13, 2009, by Fury Records.  

 The Black EP Track listing The EP (White EP) is the second extended play EP released by Random Hero. The White EP was only distributed at shows, and only in white sleeve packaging, hence the unofficial alternate name.  The band recorded the new songs at Spiked Audio in Highlands Ranch, CO and was released in May 2010, by Fury Records.

 The White EP Track listing 

The Breakdown EP'' is the third extended play EP released by Random Hero. Pre-production on a number of songs started in September 2010.  On November 1, 2010, the band began recording the new songs at Kasiaca’s, Skies Fall Studios, in Kenosha, WI and was released in May 2011, by Skies Fall Records.

Breakdown EP Track listing

Singles

Compilation appearances

References

Discographies of American artists